Kljajić is a surname found in Serbia, Bosnia and Croatia. It may refer to:

Dušan Kljajić (born 1963), retired Serbian footballer
Filip Kljajić (footballer) (born 1990), Serbian footballer
Filip Kljajić (Yugoslav Partisan) (1913–1943)
Gabriele Heinen-Kljajic (born 1962), German politician
Jovan Kljajić (born 2001), Montenegrin basketball player

Serbian surnames
Croatian surnames
Bosnian surnames